Fu Haifeng (born 23 August 1983) is a Chinese former badminton player. He is regarded as one of the greatest men's doubles players of all time.

Sport career
Combining Fu Haifeng's impressive power with his regular partner Cai Yun's impressive speed, Cai and Fu have been one of the world's leading men's doubles teams since 2004. They have won numerous top tier events on the world circuit including the venerable All England Open Championships in 2005 and 2009 and the BWF World Championships in 2006, 2009, 2010 and 2011. Cai and Fu have helped China win five consecutive Thomas Cup (Men's Team World Badminton Championships) (2004, 2006, 2008, 2010, and 2012) and four consecutive Sudirman Cup (World Team Championships) (2005, 2007, 2009 and 2011). Cai and Fu also competed together in the Olympic games 3 times, including the 2004, the 2008 Olympic Games and the 2012 Olympic Games. They were eliminated in the quarterfinals in 2004 in Athens, and in 2008 in Beijing were silver medalists, losing a close final to Indonesia's Markis Kido and Hendra Setiawan.

At the 2010 BWF World Championships in Paris, they—being the fifth seed—beat the third seed Danish pair Mathias Boe and Carsten Mogensen 21–11, 21–18 in the quarterfinals. In the semifinals, they defeated the second seed Indonesian Olympic Champions Markis Kido and Hendra Setiawan 21–16, 21–13. In the finals, they overcame the first seed and Malaysian world no. 1 Koo Kien Keat and Tan Boon Heong 18–21, 21–18, 21–14 to win the world title for the 3rd time. They are the first Men's Doubles pair to achieve this feat.

Cai and Fu went on to win the China Masters Super Series. Being the fifth seed, they first defeated their second seed compatriots Xu Chen and Guo Zhendong 21–11, 21–16 in the quarterfinals. In the semifinals, they made a great comeback against the third seed South Korean rival Lee Yong-dae and Jung Jae-sung 20–22, 21–13, 21–17. Cai and Fu then clinched their second China Masters title by defeating the fourth seed South Korean pair Yoo Yeon-seong and Ko Sung-hyun in 2 sets 21–14, 21–19. Cai and Fu won their third title in a row by winning the Yonex Japan Open Super Series. They, being the fifth seed, beat the young Korean Pair Cho Gun-woo and Kwon Yi-goo 21–14, 16–21, 21–12 in the quarterfinals. In the semifinals, they defeated their promising compatriots Zhang Nan and Chai Biao 21–17, 21–16. In the finals, they made a great comeback again against the first seed and Malaysian world no. 1 Koo Kien Keat and Tan Boon Heong 18–21, 21–14, 21–12 to win their first Japan Open title.

At the 2012 Summer Olympics, they defeated Denmark's Mathias Boe and Carsten Mogensen in the final to win the gold medal.

Having had 1 Olympic gold medal and 4 World Championship titles, as well as many other titles, Cai and Fu are one of the most successful men's doubles pair in badminton history.

An ancillary badminton achievement of Fu is that while competing in the 2005 Sudirman Cup, one of his smashes was clocked at 332 km/h (206 mph), the fastest propulsion of a shuttle on record. Fu also fired a 303 km/h smash during game 3 of the 2010 BWF World Championships men's doubles final, which was confirmed by the commentator Gillian Clark as the fastest of the tournament. The fastest smash by Fu during the 2011 Sudirman Cup final was clocked at 291 km/h.

In 2014, Fu played with mixed doubles champion Zhang Nan in the All England Super Series. They lost to the Indonesian pair Muhammad Ahsan and Hendra Setiawan in the quarter finals 21-23 20–22. Later on it, they took revenge at Denmark Open Super Series, and became the champion after beating top seed Korean pair Lee Yong-dae and Yoo Yeon-seong in 2 straight sets in the final.

In 2015, his partnership with Zhang Nan was stable after reaching several Super Series Finals such as Singapore Open, Indonesia Open, Japan Open, All England as runners-up.

In 2016, they won the Singapore Open Super Series after beating the top seed from Korea Lee/Yoo in 2 straight sets at semi final. Their performance later in several Super Series was not so climatic. They were seeded 4th in the Olympic Games in Rio, as Fu claimed his second gold medal in men's doubles category after beating Malaysian's pair Tan/Goh in 3 sets. He ends his career having reached 3 consecutive finals in the Olympic Games with two different partners, winning gold twice.

Achievements

Olympic Games 
Men's doubles

BWF World Championships 
Men's doubles

World Cup 
Men's doubles

Asian Championships 
Men's doubles

BWF Superseries (16 titles, 14 runners-up) 
The BWF Superseries, which was launched on 14 December 2006 and implemented in 2007, was a series of elite badminton tournaments, sanctioned by the Badminton World Federation (BWF). BWF Superseries levels were Superseries and Superseries Premier. A season of Superseries consisted of twelve tournaments around the world that had been introduced since 2011. Successful players were invited to the Superseries Finals, which were held at the end of each year.

Men's doubles

  BWF Superseries Finals tournament
  BWF Superseries Premier tournament
  BWF Superseries tournament

BWF Grand Prix (8 titles, 8 runners-up) 
The BWF Grand Prix had two levels, the Grand Prix and Grand Prix Gold. It was a series of badminton tournaments sanctioned by the Badminton World Federation (BWF) and played between 2007 and 2017. The World Badminton Grand Prix was sanctioned by the International Badminton Federation from 1983 to 2006.

Men's doubles

 BWF Grand Prix Gold tournament
 BWF & IBF Grand Prix tournament

Performance timeline

National team 
 Senior level

Individual competitions 
 Men's doubles

Family
Fu's grandfather was from Liancheng, Fujian. Once his grandfather migrated to Indonesia, because of the anti-Chinese riots in 1960s there, his family moved back to China and settled in Jieyang, Guangdong.

References

External links
 
 
 Fu Haifeng's Blog 
 
 
 
 

1984 births
Living people
People from Jieyang
Hakka sportspeople
Badminton players from Guangdong
Chinese male badminton players
Badminton players at the 2004 Summer Olympics
Badminton players at the 2008 Summer Olympics
Badminton players at the 2012 Summer Olympics
Badminton players at the 2016 Summer Olympics
Olympic badminton players of China
2016 Olympic gold medalists for China
Olympic silver medalists for China
Olympic medalists in badminton
Medalists at the 2008 Summer Olympics
Medalists at the 2012 Summer Olympics
Badminton players at the 2006 Asian Games
Badminton players at the 2010 Asian Games
Badminton players at the 2014 Asian Games
Asian Games gold medalists for China
Asian Games silver medalists for China
Asian Games medalists in badminton
Medalists at the 2006 Asian Games
Medalists at the 2010 Asian Games
Medalists at the 2014 Asian Games
World No. 1 badminton players
BWF Best Male Player of the Year
21st-century Chinese people